Ayvacık is a town and a district of Samsun Province of Turkey. The mayor is Mustafa Belür (AKP).

References

Populated places in Samsun Province
Districts of Samsun Province